Porcupine Meat is an album by blues musician Bobby Rush.  It was released by Rounder Records on September 16, 2016.

Porcupine Meat won the 2017 Grammy Award for Best Traditional Blues Album.

Track listing
All songs written by Bobby Rush, except "Got Me Accused" by Bobby Rush and Scott Billington, and "Snake in the Grass" and "Catfish Stew"  by Bobby Rush, Scott Billington, and Johnette Downing.
 "I Don't Want Nobody Hanging Around"
 "Porcupine Meat" (featuring Vasti Jackson)
 "Got Me Accused"
 "Snake in the Grass"
 "Funk o' de Funk"
 "Me, Myself and I" (featuring Joe Bonamassa)
 "Catfish Stew"
 "It's Your Move" (featuring Dave Alvin)
 "Nighttime Gardner" (featuring Keb' Mo')
 "I Think Your Dress Is Too Short"
 "Standing on Shaky Ground"
 "I'm Tired" (Tangle Eye Mix)

Personnel
 Produced by Scott Billington
 Recording, mixing: Steve Reynolds
 Assistant engineers: Nick Guttman, Matt Grondin
 Assistant engineer: Jake Eckert
 Mastering: Paul Blakemore
 Musical director: Vasti Jackson
 Horn arrangements: Jeff Albert
 Photography: Rick Olivier
 Art direction, cover, book backpage design: Carrie Smith
 Package Design: Jimmy Hole
 Thanks to Dave Clements and the Circle Bar
 Dave Alvin recorded by Craig Parker Adams at Winslow Ct. Studio, Los Angeles, CA.  Session co-produced by Jeff DeLia
 Joe Bonamassa recorded by Angelo Caputo, assisted by Sean Madden, at NightBird Recording Studios, West Hollywood, CA
 Keb' Mo' recorded by Kevin R. Moore II aka P. Roosevelt at Treehouse, Los Angeles, CA

References

Blues albums by American artists
2016 albums